Constancio Jurgens, C.I.C.M., D.D. (12 December 1879 – 3 June 1952) was a Dutch CICM Missionary, educator and served as the 3rd Bishop of the Diocese of Tuguegarao.

Coat of arms

The coat of arms of Bishop Jurgens bears the motto "" which translates into "To the Eucharistic Jesus though Mary".

References

External links

 
 Eclesiastico de Filipinas ; Volume 06, año VI, number 64 (September 1928)
 Eclesiastico de Filipinas ; Volume 24, año XXVIII, number 269 (November 1950)

1879 births
1952 deaths
Roman Catholic bishops of Tuguegarao